Fastest thing alive may refer to:
Fastest animals
The Fastest Thing Alive, the theme song for the TV series Sonic the Hedgehog

See also
The Fastest Kid Alive, an album
Flash (DC Comics character), sometimes referring to himself as the fastest man alive
Fastest Man Alive, an episode of The Flash television series
List of world records in athletics